Teemu Huttu (born May 26, 1991) is Finnish professional ice hockey centre who currently plays for Visby/Roma HK in Hockeyettan, the third-tier league in Sweden.

Career
Huttu began his career playing for Kärpät's junior teams but was unable to feature in their senior team. He joined Kiekko-Laser for the 2011–12 Mestis season but the team went bankrupt by December and he eventually returned to Kärpät's U20 team.

On June 30, 2012, Huttu joined Hokki in Mestis for one season, which then followed by single season spells at SaPKo, KeuPa HT and Kokkolan before returning to Hokki on May 20, 2016, again for one season. He then rejoined KeuPa HT on April 28, 2017, and signed an extension with the team for a second season on September 18, 2018.

On July 1, 2019, Huttu moved to Sweden to sign for Visby/Roma in the Hockeyettan.

References

External links

1991 births
Living people
Finnish ice hockey centres
Hokki players
Iisalmen Peli-Karhut players
KeuPa HT players
Kiekko-Laser players
People from Kiiminki
SaPKo players
Visby/Roma HK players
Finnish expatriate ice hockey players in Sweden
Sportspeople from North Ostrobothnia